The Hard Way is a 2004 blues album by Tinsley Ellis. It was recorded and mixed at Stonehenge at ZAC Atlanta, Georgia, engineered and mixed by Jimmy Zumpano, mastered by Rodney Mills and produced by Tinsley Ellis with Robert Woods as executive producer. Tinsley wrote all songs except for "Still in the Game" and "Me Without You".

Track listing
 "Still in the Game"
 "Let Him Down Easy"
 "Me Without You"
 "I'll Get Over You"
 "And It Hurts"
 "La La Land"
 "My Love's the Medicine"
 "Fountain of Youth"
 "Love Bomb"
 "Her Other Man"
 "Pack Poet"
 "The Last Song"

Musicians
Tinsley Ellis – guitar, vocals
The Evil One – bass guitar  
Oliver Wood – guitar 
Richie Hayward and Wes Johnson – drums 
Kevin McKendree – keyboards  
Count M'butu –  congas, bongos, shaker
Adam Mewheter – trombone
Marcus James – saxophone, tambourine
Sean Costello – harmonica
Lola Gulley, Donna Hopkins, Vickie Salz – background vocals

References

External links
Tinsley Ellis website

2004 albums
Tinsley Ellis albums